Eladio Enrique Herrera Segovia (born 13 July 1984) is a Chilean former professional footballer who played as a defender.

Career
A product of Coquimbo Unido youth system, Herrera made his professional debut in 2002, with whom reached the final of the 2005 Torneo Apertura. From 2008 to 2011 he played for Deportes Puerto Montt, becoming the top goalscorer as a defender for the club. In 2012 he joined Santiago Wanderers.

After his retirement, he has played for the amateur club Unión Bellavista of the Asociación San Juan from Coquimbo, performing as the team captain and coach and winning various regional and national championships.

Honours
Deportes Iquique
 Copa Chile (1): 2013–14

Unión Bellavista
 Campeonato Regional Amateur (3): 2017, 2018, 2019

References

External links
 
 
 Eladio Herrera at Playmakerstats.com

1984 births
Living people
People from La Serena
Chilean footballers
Coquimbo Unido footballers
Puerto Montt footballers
Santiago Wanderers footballers
Deportes Iquique footballers
Chilean Primera División players
Primera B de Chile players
Association football defenders